Tarucus callinara, the spotted Pierrot, is a small butterfly found in India that belongs to the lycaenids or blues family found in India, Myanmar and Thailand.

See also
List of butterflies of India
List of butterflies of India (Lycaenidae)

References

 
 
 
 
 
 

Tarucus
Insects of Pakistan
Butterflies described in 1886